Chiloglanis congicus is a species of upside-down catfish endemic to the Democratic Republic of the Congo where it occurs in the lower Congo River basin.  This species grows to a length of  TL.

References

External links 

congicus
Freshwater fish of Africa
Fish of the Democratic Republic of the Congo
Endemic fauna of the Democratic Republic of the Congo
Taxa named by George Albert Boulenger
Fish described in 1920